General Blood was a FDA registered and AABB accredited distributor of human blood, platelets, and plasma for hospitals, non-transfusion facilities, and group-purchasing organizations. General Blood's process was designed to balance excesses and shortages of blood by improving supply chain efficiencies and logistical models within the blood distribution industry. The company is now defunct.

Overview
General Blood was founded by David Mitchell and Ben Bowman, who both received MBA’s from the Carlson School of Management at the University of Minnesota. Bowman began researching the blood distribution industry in 2007 while still enrolled in the MBA program. General Blood LLC was created in 2010 and is headquartered in downtown Minneapolis, Minnesota on the Mississippi River. Ben Bowman is Chief Executive Officer at General Blood, and David Mitchell is the Executive Vice President. In 2013, General Blood was an exhibitor for the Clinical Laboratory Management Association. In 2012, General Blood was a Minnesota Cup Semi-Finalist in the Bio-Science and Health IT Division.

References

Health care companies based in Minnesota